Sir Edward Michael Ogden, QC (9 April 1926 – 31 January 2003) was a British barrister. The chairman of the Criminal Injuries Compensation Board from 1975 to 1989, he is best remembered for heading the working party which produced the eponymous Ogden tables, actuarial tables used by courts to assess future losses in personal injury and fatal accident cases.

References 

 
 
 
 

Knights Bachelor
2003 deaths
People educated at Downside School
Royal Armoured Corps officers
Alumni of Jesus College, Cambridge
Members of Lincoln's Inn
English King's Counsel
20th-century King's Counsel
English Roman Catholics
Conservative Party (UK) parliamentary candidates